Azerenjan (also Romanized as Āẕerenjān; also known as Āderenjān) is a village in Fathabad Rural District, in the Central District of Baft County, Kerman Province, Iran. At the 2006 census, its population was 15, in 5 families.

References 

Populated places in Baft County